Alessandro Sperelli C.O. (1589–1671) was a Roman Catholic prelate who served as Bishop of Gubbio (1644–1671), Apostolic Nuncio to Naples (1652–1653), Auxiliary Bishop of Ostia e Velletri (1642–1644), and Titular Bishop of Orthosias in Caria (1642–1644).

Biography
Alessandro Sperelli was born in 1590 in  Assisi, Italy and ordained a priest in the Congregation of the Oratory of Saint Philip Neri. His nephew Sperello Sperelli would become cardinal in 1699.
On 28 Apr 1642, he was appointed during the papacy of Pope Urban VIII as Titular Bishop of Orthosias in Caria and Auxiliary Bishop of Ostia e Velletri.
On 4 May 1642, he was consecrated bishop by Giulio Cesare Sacchetti, Cardinal-Priest of Santa Susanna, with Lelio Falconieri, Titular Archbishop of Thebae, and Giovanni Battista Altieri (seniore), Bishop Emeritus of Camerino, serving as co-consecrators. 
On 14 Mar 1644, he was appointed during the papacy of Pope Urban VIII as Bishop of Gubbio.
On 23 Oct 1652, he was appointed during the papacy of Pope Innocent X as Apostolic Nuncio to Naples; he served as nuncio until 15 Nov 1653.
He served as Bishop of Gubbio until his death on 19 Dec 1671.

While bishop, he was the principal co-consecrator of Carlo Labia, Archbishop of Corfù (1659).

In 1666, his endowment of his large collection of books and manuscripts to the city led to the formation of the Biblioteca Comunale Sperelliana in Gubbio.

References

External links and additional sources

 (for Chronology of Bishops) 
 (for Chronology of Bishops) 
 (for Chronology of Bishops)  

17th-century Italian Roman Catholic bishops
Bishops appointed by Pope Urban VIII
Bishops appointed by Pope Innocent X
1590 births
1671 deaths
Oratorian bishops
People from Assisi
Apostolic Nuncios to the Kingdom of Naples